İlhan Cihaner (born 23 February 1968, Kağızman), is a Turkish leftist politician and a former prosecutor. He's a parliamentary deputy for the Republican People's Party (CHP) since 2011. He was the Chief Public Prosecutor of Erzincan from 2007; he resigned in 2011 in order to stand for election. He is a suspect in the Ergenekon trials. 
He is a columnist for the soL newspaper.

Career
Cihaner, then a prosecutor in İdil (Şırnak Province), was the first prosecutor to point at the Turkish Gendarmerie's JİTEM, in an indictment of 1997. He held the defendants including civil servants, confessors and others responsible for killings, bombings and "disappearances". Defendant No. 1 was Ahmet Cem Ersever and defendant No. 2 was Arif Doğan.

He was appointed Chief Public Prosecutor of Erzincan in 2007. In this position he ordered an investigation of the İsmailağa and Fettullah Gülen religious communities. Some months later, Taraf published a plan entitled "Action Plan against Religious Radicalism", an alleged plan to discredit religious communities and the AKP government by planting weapons. A Justice Ministry investigation followed, and the İsmailağa case was transferred to another prosecutor, Osman Şanal, on the grounds that there were allegations that İsmailağa was a terrorist group. Osman Sanal wire tapped the Chief Public Prosecutor, Ilhan Cihaner The same year,(November 2010)Osman Sanal litigated newspaper reporter İlhan Taşçı about his book on Ismailaga religious society. Osman Sanal was arrested and charged as a member of Fettulah Terrorist Organization (FETO)who were attempted coup in 2016.

Charges
Cihaner was arrested in February 2010 as part of the Ergenekon trials investigation, and charged with membership of “Ergenekon” organization. Court ordered release of Ilhan Cihaner during his trial in August 2010. 'He was appointed a public prosecutor in Adana in November 2010.

Cihaner was found not guilty in conspiracy cases which were conducted by the members of Gulenist's prosecutors who were fled from Turkey

Political views 
Cihaner is self-described as a leftist and social democrat, while he and his caucus within the party, Us for Future (Gelecek için Biz), stand for more radical left-wing values that includes democratic and socialist sentiments. He opposes nationalism, Imperialism, militarism, Interventionism, and supports left-populist values such as race and gender equality, withdrawal of troops from foreign countries and LGBT rights.

References

External links
 Cihaner's columns at soL
 Interview with Mr. İlhan Cihaner: “The Political Landscape, Problem of Justice, and Media Ethics in Turkey”, researchturkey.org, 21 May 2012
 https://twitter.com/ilhancihaner 

1968 births
Living people
Turkish prosecutors
People from Kağızman
Deputies of Denizli
Contemporary Republican People's Party (Turkey) politicians
Members of the 25th Parliament of Turkey
Members of the 24th Parliament of Turkey
Members of the 26th Parliament of Turkey